The National Broadcasting Company (NBC) is an American broadcast television network that originated as a radio network in November 1926, and expanded into television in April 1939. Throughout its history, the network has had many owned-and-operated and affiliated stations.

This article is a table listing of former NBC stations, arranged alphabetically by state, and based on the station's city of license as well as its Designated Market Area; it is also accompanied by footnotes regarding the present network affiliation of the former NBC-affiliated station (if the station remains operational) and the current NBC affiliates in each of the listed markets, as well as any other notes including the reasons behind each station's disaffiliation from the network. There are links to and articles on each of the stations, describing their histories, local programming, and technical information, such as broadcast frequencies.

The station's advertised channel number follows the call letters. In most cases, this is their virtual channel (PSIP) number, which may match the channel allocation that the station originally broadcast on during its prior affiliation with the network.

Former affiliate stations 
Stations are listed in alphabetical order by city of license.

See also 
 List of NBC television affiliates (table)
 List of NBC television affiliates (by U.S. state)

References 

NBC former